Preiner Gscheid Pass (el. 1070 m.) is a high mountain pass in the Austrian Alps in the Bundesland of Lower Austria. The pass connects Kapellen and Reichenau an der Rax.

See also
 List of highest paved roads in Europe
 List of mountain passes

Mountain passes of the Alps
Mountain passes of Lower Austria
Rax-Schneeberg Group